Austin is an unincorporated community in Ross County, in the U.S. state of Ohio.

History
A post office called Austin was in operation from 1848 until 1933. The community was named after Austin Bush, the proprietor of a local gristmill.

References

Unincorporated communities in Ross County, Ohio
Unincorporated communities in Ohio
1848 establishments in Ohio